Nicky Johns is an English retired football goalkeeper who played both in the Football League and the North American Soccer League.

Johns began his career with Minehead. In 1976, he signed with Millwall. In 1978, he played eight games with the Tampa Bay Rowdies of the North American Soccer League. However, the Rowdies had two good goalkeepers in Winston DuBose and Paul Hammond. Consequently, Johns saw time in only eight games before being sent on loan to Sheffield United where he played one game. The Rowdies then sent him on loan to Charlton Athletic. In February 1979, the Rowdies traded Johns to Charlton in exchange for Mike Flanagan who had recently been ejected from a Charlton game for fighting with his teammate Derek Hales. Johns experienced his greatest success at Charlton. Over ten seasons, he played 288 games and was named the 1981, 1983 and 1984 Charlton Player of the Year. He later played for Queens Park Rangers before finishing his career with Maidstone United.

In 2003, he became an assistant manager with Erith Town in the Kent League.

References

External links
 
 NASL stats

1957 births
Living people
Association football goalkeepers
Charlton Athletic F.C. players
English footballers
English expatriate footballers
Maidstone United F.C. (1897) players
Millwall F.C. players
North American Soccer League (1968–1984) players
Queens Park Rangers F.C. players
Sheffield United F.C. players
Tampa Bay Rowdies (1975–1993) players
English expatriate sportspeople in the United States
Expatriate soccer players in the United States